Holwell is a village and civil parish about  south of Burford in West Oxfordshire. The 2001 Census recorded the parish's population as 17.

History
During the time that Robert de Chesney was Bishop of Lincoln (1148–66), land at Holwell was given to the Cistercian Abbey at Bruern.  The Church of England parish church of Saint Mary was built in the 13th century. It was rebuilt in 1842 and again in 1895. The latter rebuilding was designed by the architect Walter Mills of Banbury, using a Gothic Revival interpretation of Perpendicular Gothic.  St Mary's parish is now part of the Benefice of Shill Valley and Broadshire, which includes also the parishes of Alvescot, Black Bourton, Broadwell, Broughton Poggs, Filkins, Kelmscott, Kencot, Langford, Little Faringdon, Shilton and Westwell.

Attractions
The Cotswold Wildlife Park is within the ecclesiastical parish of Holwell, and the bordering civil parish of Broadwell.

References

Sources and further reading

External links

Civil parishes in Oxfordshire
Villages in Oxfordshire
West Oxfordshire District